Gordon Milford Hudson (January 5, 1894 – July 10, 1959) was a Canadian curler. He was a two-time Brier champion.

Hudson was the first skip to win two Briers, which he won back to back in 1928 and 1929.  Hudson grew up in Kenora, Ontario, and participated in many Manitoba Curling Association Bonspiels. In 1916, his family moved to Winnipeg. Hudson fought in World War I, and then joined the now defunct Strathcona Curling Club. In 1928, he won his first Brier. His Manitoba team, which also included Sam Penwarden, Ron Singbush and Bill Grant finished the round robin with a 7-2 record, tied with Alberta and Toronto. In a special tie-breaker, Hudson's rink defeated Alberta 10-7 and Toronto 12-6 to claim the first Brier title for the province. At the 1929 Brier, Hudson and his Manitoba rink (which now included Don Rollo in place of Penwarden) went undefeated, finishing with a 9-0 record, giving him his second Brier title.

From 1949 to 1950, he served as president of the Dominion Curling Association. Hudson's son, Bruce Hudson was also an accomplished curler.

In 1985 Gordon Hudson was inducted into the Manitoba Sports Hall of Fame.

References

External links

Brier champions
1894 births
1959 deaths
Canadian military personnel of World War I
Sportspeople from Kenora
Curlers from Winnipeg
Manitoba Sports Hall of Fame inductees
Curlers from Ontario
Canadian male curlers
Curling Canada presidents